Usnea taylorii is a fruticose lichen in the family Parmeliaceae.

Ecology
Its predators include the land snail Notodiscus hookeri.

References

taylorii
Lichen species
Lichens described in 1844
Taxa named by Joseph Dalton Hooker
Taxa named by Thomas Taylor (botanist)